Björbo is a locality situated in Gagnef Municipality, Dalarna County, Sweden with 697 inhabitants in 2010.

References 

Populated places in Dalarna County
Populated places in Gagnef Municipality